Igors Rausis (born April 7, 1961) is a retired chess International Master. He was awarded the title of Grandmaster by FIDE in 1992, but the title was stripped away after he was caught cheating in 2019. He won the Latvian Chess Championship in 1995. He represented Bangladesh from 2003 to 2007, when he switched to the Czech Republic.

In July 2019, Rausis was caught cheating in a Strasbourg tournament, after which he admitted to the transgression and announced his immediate retirement from chess. The Czech Chess Federation subsequently cancelled his membership, and the FIDE Ethics Commission stripped him of his Grandmaster title and gave him a 6-year ban. Before this, he was the oldest player ranked among FIDE's top 100 players.

Chess career
Rausis won the Latvian Chess Championship in 1995. He played for team Latvia in three Chess Olympiads:
 In 1996, at the second board in the 32nd Chess Olympiad in Yerevan (+2−2=8);
 In 1998, at the third board in the 33rd Chess Olympiad in Elista (+2−2=8);
 In 2002, at the second board in the 35th Chess Olympiad in Bled (+1−1=1).

He represented Latvia at the 1993 World Team Chess Championship in Lucerne, at the first reserve board (+0−2=2).

Rausis was also active as a trainer; he coached the Latvian women's team at the 1994 Olympiad, the Bangladeshi team at the 2000, 2002, 2008 and 2018 Olympiads, the Algerian team at the 2010 Olympiad, and the team of Jersey at the 2012 and 2014 Olympiads. In 2018, he was awarded the title of FIDE Trainer.

In July 2019, Rausis was caught cheating in the Strasbourg Open, using a mobile phone in the toilet. He admitted to having cheated, and announced his retirement from chess. Prior to the incident, Rausis had been under suspicion for several months; FIDE's Fair Play Commission Secretary, Yuri Garrett, stated in a Facebook post that the Commission "has been closely following [Rausis] for months" on the basis of Ken Regan's statistical insights. On December 5, 2019, the FIDE Ethics Commission banned Rausis from all FIDE-rated chess tournaments for 6 years, and formally revoked his Grandmaster title. 

In 2020, Rausis entered a small tournament in Latvia under the name Isa Kasimi. He was recognised by Arturs Neikšāns, provoking anger from other players, and withdrew from the tournament.

Personal life
Rausis was married to Olita Rause, a Latvian Woman Grandmaster, and has two sons with her. In 2003, there were allegations that he provided "occasional help" to his wife during correspondence chess tournaments.

References

External links
 

1961 births
Living people
Bangladeshi chess players
Cheating in chess
Chess coaches
Chess International Masters
Chess Olympiad competitors
Czech chess players
Latvian chess players
National team coaches
People from Alchevsk
Soviet chess players